Decker's Chapel is a historic chapel on Earth Road  and PA 255 in St. Marys, Elk County, Pennsylvania within the Diocese of Erie.

Description
It was built in 1856 and is a one-story gable-end oriented and clapboard clad wood-frame structure.  It measures 12 feet by 18 feet and contains a single, plastered room.  It features a rectangular steeple with an open belfry capped with a cross tipped, pyramidal roof.  Also on the property is a granite commemorative marker dedicated in 1928 to Monsignor Michael Joseph Decker.

It was added to the National Register of Historic Places in 1998.

Gallery

References

Roman Catholic churches in Pennsylvania
Properties of religious function on the National Register of Historic Places in Pennsylvania
Churches in Elk County, Pennsylvania
St. Marys, Pennsylvania
National Register of Historic Places in Elk County, Pennsylvania